Mindaugas Kačinas (born June 30, 1993) is a Lithuanian professional basketball player for San Pablo Burgos of the LEB Oro. He plays at the power forward position.

Early career 
Kačinas played for Word of Life Fire Traditional School in Wichita, Kansas under head coach Ryan Hujing, averaging 23.6 points and 12.1 rebounds in his senior season.

College career
Kačinas played college basketball for South Carolina from 2012 to 2016, averaging 6.7 points in 132 games.

Professional career 
After graduating from the South Carolina Gamecocks, Kačinas signed a two-year deal with Neptūnas Klaipėda.

In December 2018, Kačinas signed with Keflavík of the Icelandic Úrvalsdeild karla. In his debut, he had 20 points and 8 rebounds in a narrow loss against Njarðvík.

In July 2019 Kačinas signed a one-year deal with Palencia Baloncesto of the second Spanish league. He averaged 8.7 points and 6.1 rebounds per game on 54.9 percent shooting in 2019–20.

On September 23, 2022, he has signed with San Pablo Burgos of the LEB Oro.

International career 
Kačinas played in 2013 FIBA Europe Under-20 Championship for Lithuania men's national under-20 and was one of the team's leaders, averaging 9 points, 5.5 rebounds and 1.3 assists per game.

Personal 
Mindaugas is the son of Ricardas Kačinas and Rita Kaciniene. He has a brother, Arvydas, and a sister, Reda. He supports the Miami Heat and is a fan of Kevin Durant. At South Carolina, he majored in hotel management.

References

External links
College statistics at Sports Reference
Profile at realgm.com

1993 births
Living people
Basketball players from Klaipėda
BC Neptūnas players
CB Breogán players
CB Miraflores players
Keflavík men's basketball players
Liga ACB players
Lithuanian expatriate basketball people in Iceland
Lithuanian expatriate basketball people in the United States
Lithuanian men's basketball players
Medalists at the 2017 Summer Universiade
Power forwards (basketball)
South Carolina Gamecocks men's basketball players
Universiade medalists in basketball
Úrvalsdeild karla (basketball) players
Universiade gold medalists for Lithuania